The AGM-136A Tacit Rainbow was a United States military anti-radiation missile program run from 1982 to 1991.

The requirement was for a low-cost air-launchable system to aid in the destruction of enemy air defense networks. The proposed unit would combine elements of cruise missiles and UAVs, it would be launched in large numbers by heavy bombers, fighters, or possibly mass ground launch systems. 

This extended patrol time on target ("loiter time") was the key feature of the new system, a persistent anti-radiation missile (PARM) as opposed to a HARM.

The project was started by the DoD in 1982, but moved to the control of the USAF Aeronautical Systems Division in 1984 as a joint Navy/Air Force project. The majority of the system was designed and developed by Northrop with Texas Instruments providing the seek head and Boeing providing a system that allowed it to be launched from B-52 bombers. The first test air-launch was on July 30, 1984.

It massed around  including the  warhead. Power was provided by a Williams F121 turbofan, producing   of thrust from the 0.9 m, 22 kg unit. 

Some sources state that production units would have used a  variant of the Williams International WR-24. Each unit was to cost around $200,000, up to thirty would have been loaded in a single B-52.

The Naval Research Advisory Committee reported in 1989 that the project was not progressing well. In 1991 a DoD audit found numerous management problems. The program was canceled in 1991 (FY 1992), without any production units and at a total cost of around $4 billion. It was only the second post-Vietnam military project to be canceled after completing testing but before production.

Survivors

Below is a list of museums which have a Tacit Rainbow in their collection:
Museum of Aviation, Robins Air Force Base, Georgia
 National Museum of the United States Air Force, Wright-Patterson Air Force Base, Ohio
 U.S. Naval Museum of Armament & Technology, NAWS China Lake, California

References

External links
Global security article
AGM-136 on APA
Directory of U.S. Military Rockets and Missiles

AGM-136
AGM-136
Abandoned military rocket and missile projects of the United States